The Church of St Mary Magdalene in Winsford, Somerset, England, dates back to the Norman period before the 13th century and has been designated by English Heritage as a Grade I listed building.

Winsford church is dedicated to St Mary Magdalene and was partly restored in 1858. There are six bells; the four heaviest were made by Thomas Bilbie in Cullompton in 1765.

Within the church is a fine painted panel created in 1609 during the reign of King James I. The ironwork on the inner doors of the church is thought to date from the 13th century, originating from the priory of St Nichola in Barlynch, and the font is from the Norman period. The organ was installed c. 1900, being delivered by horse-drawn wagon from nearby Dulverton.  The church register dates back to 1660.

See also

 List of Grade I listed buildings in West Somerset
 List of towers in Somerset
 List of ecclesiastical parishes in the Diocese of Bath and Wells

References

External links

13th-century church buildings in England
Grade I listed churches in Somerset
Grade I listed buildings in West Somerset